Ryan Air, Inc. is an American airline that serves over 70 villages in Bush Alaska out of hubs in Anchorage, Aniak, Bethel, Emmonak, Kotzebue, Nome, St. Mary's, and Unalakleet. Offering primarily cargo services, Ryan Air also operates scheduled passenger service out of Aniak, and passenger or cargo charters throughout Alaska.

History
Ryan Air was established in 1953 as Unalakleet Air Taxi by Wilfred Ryan Sr. as a charter airline. In the 1960s, the company began handling USPS mail delivery and transportation of schoolteachers for the Bureau of Indian Affairs between communities along the lower Yukon River. In 1977, Wilfred P. Ryan Jr. took over the company after his father died of cancer.

In 1979, the company expanded service beyond the Norton Sound and changed their name to Ryan Air. With a new fleet of Beech 1900s and Beech 99s, Ryan Air grew to the largest commuter carrier in Alaska by 1987, serving 85 cities and villages with a fleet of 28 planes. However, a series of 12 accidents, culminating in a fatal crash of flight 103 on 23 November 1987 that killed 18 of the 21 people on board, led the FAA to shut down the airline in January 1988.

In the 1990s, Ryan Air converted to a cargo-only airline and changed their name to Arctic Transportation Services (ATS), adding CASA 212 cargo planes to their fleet. They changed their name back to Ryan Air in 2010.

In 2011, Ryan Air began passenger charters out of Anchorage, using a newly acquired Pilatus PC-12.

In 2014, Ryan Air resumed regularly scheduled passenger services out of Aniak, AK using their Cessna 207 aircraft.

In 2015 Ryan Air acquired a fifth CASA 212.

In 2017 Ryan Air adds 2 SAAB 340s, based in Anchorage, to their fleet.

In 2019 Lee Ryan is appointed as President of Ryan Air, Inc.

Destinations 
Ryan Air Services maintains the following scheduled passenger routes (as of January 2021):

From/To Aniak
 Aniak - Holy Cross - Anvik - Grayling - Shageluk - Aniak
 Aniak - Kalskag - Russian Mission - Aniak
 Aniak - Chuathbaluk - Crooked Creek - Sleetmute - Stony River - Aniak
 Aniak - Bethel - Aniak (non-stop)
 Aniak - Anchorage - Aniak (non-stop)

From/To Bethel
 Bethel - Chevak - Hooper Bay - Scammon Bay - Bethel
 Bethel - Mekoryuk - Toksook Bay - Tununak - Bethel
 Bethel - Atmautluak - Marhsall - St. Mary's
 Bethel - Aniak (non-stop)
 Aniak - Bethel (non-stop)

From/To Anchorage
 Anchorage - Aniak - Anchorage (non-stop)

Fleet
, the Ryan Air Services fleet consists of 20 aircraft, including:

References

External links
 
 NTSB Aircraft Accident Report for Flight 103

1953 establishments in Alaska
Airlines established in 1953
Cargo airlines of the United States
Charter airlines of the United States
Companies based in Anchorage, Alaska
Airlines based in Alaska